Leslie Allen (born March 12, 1957) is an American retired professional tennis player.

Unranked in junior tennis, Leslie Allen was an ATA, NCAA & WTA Champion. Allen was a member of the University of Southern California national championship team and in 1977 graduated magna cum laude with a Bachelor of Arts in speech communications. She joined the WTA Tour in 1977 and went on to reach a career high ranking of No. 17 in the world in February 1981.

In 1981, Allen became the first African American woman to win a significant pro tennis tournament since Althea Gibson in 1958 when she won the Avon Championships of Detroit, although Renee Blount is also credited with this feat because she won the Futures of Columbus in 1979. Allen qualified for the season-ending 1981 Avon Championships which featured the eight best players of the winter Avon Championships Circuit. She was also a mixed doubles finalist at the 1983 French Open partnering Charles Strode

After retiring from professional tennis, she became a television broadcaster and was also elected to the WTA Board of Directors. Allen founded the Leslie Allen Foundation to introduce young people to the 100+ careers behind the scenes in pro tennis. Through the Foundation's Win4Life program students are challenged to use the Win4Life 4D's (Desire, Dedication, Determination, Discipline) to succeed on and off the court. Allen currently works as a real estate agent in New Jersey and is a motivational speaker.

Grand Slam finals

Mixed doubles (1 runner-up)

References

External links
 
 
 Leslie Allen Foundation

1957 births
Living people
African-American tennis coaches
African-American female tennis players
American female tennis players
Sportspeople from Cleveland
Tennis people from Ohio
USC Trojans women's tennis players
Female sports coaches
21st-century African-American people
21st-century African-American women
20th-century African-American sportspeople
20th-century African-American women
20th-century African-American people